VistaCreate (formerly Crello) is an online graphic design platform for non-designers, launched in 2016. As of 2022, it has more than 10 million users in 192 countries.

Overview 
VistaCreate (then known as Crello) was launched in 2016 as a part of Depositphotos. In 2019, the product hit a milestone of 1 million registered users and also launched mobile apps. In 2020, the library of templates and objects became free. A music library and a background remover tool were added to the platform. In May 2021, Moufflons Basketball, in collaboration with VistaCreate, organized a poster design competition in support of gender equality in sports. In October 2021, Vistaprint acquired Crello and its parent company, Depositphotos, for a total price of $85 million. After the acquisition, Crello was rebranded to VistaCreate. Along with Vistaprint and 99designs, it became part of the new Vista parent brand.

After Russia started a full-scale war on the territory of Ukraine in February 2022, VistaCreate suspended all business in Russia and Belarus. VistaCreate's team and Depositphotos gathered collections of images and templates dedicated to the war in Ukraine.

References 

Graphics software